16S or 16s may refer to:
 Ribosomal RNAs, in biology:
 prokaryotic 16S ribosomal RNA
 mitochondrial 16S ribosomal RNA
 Myrtle Creek Municipal Airport's FAA identifier
 Fujitsu Micro 16s, a 1983 Business personal computer
Sulfur (16S), a chemical element

See also
S16 (disambiguation)